Pedro Felipe Ferreira Santos, commonly known as Pedrinho is a Brazilian footballer who plays as a forward for Atlético Goianiense.

He has previously represented URT in 2016 Campeonato Brasileiro Série D.

References

External links
 

Living people
1994 births
Brazilian footballers
Association football forwards
Boa Esporte Clube players
União Recreativa dos Trabalhadores players
Guarani Esporte Clube (MG) players
Atlético Clube Goianiense players
Campeonato Brasileiro Série B players
Campeonato Brasileiro Série D players
People from Aracaju
Sportspeople from Sergipe